Termera, also known as Termerum or Termeron (Τερμερον), was a maritime town of ancient Caria on the south coast of the peninsula of Halicarnassus, near Cape Termerium. Stephanus of Byzantium erroneously assigns the town to Lycia. It was a polis (city-state) and a member of the Delian League. Under the Romans this Dorian town was a free city. According to the Suda the place gave rise to the proverbial expression Τερμέρια κακά, it being used as a prison by the rulers of Caria. In Greek mythology, it was founded by Termerus, after whom it was named.

Its site is located near Asarlık, Asiatic Turkey.

References

Populated places in ancient Caria
Former populated places in Turkey
Locations in Greek mythology
Greek city-states
Members of the Delian League